The 2013 Christy Ring Cup was the ninth staging of the Christy Ring Cup hurling championship since its establishment by the Gaelic Athletic Association in 2005. The cup competition began on 4 May 2013 and ended on 8 June 2013.

London were defending champions, however, they were promoted to the All-Ireland Senior Hurling Championship. Down won the title following a 3-16 to 2-17 victory over Kerry in the final.

Fixtures

Round 1

Round 2A

Round 2B

Quarter-finals

Semi-finals

Final

Top scorers

Season

Single game

References

External links
 Christy Ring Cup fixtures

Christy Ring Cup
Christy Ring Cup